Lee Zion (born 27 May 1996) is a South Korean table tennis player. Her highest career ITTF ranking was 70.

References

1996 births
Living people
South Korean female table tennis players
21st-century South Korean women